The Perfect Specimen  is a 1937 film directed by Michael Curtiz and starring Errol Flynn and Joan Blondell. The picture is based on a novel by Samuel Hopkins Adams.

It was Flynn's first comedy.

Plot
Gerald Wicks, the heir to a large fortune, has never been outside the gates of his childhood estate. He goes on an adventure with newspaper reporter Mona Carter and they fall in love.

Cast
Errol Flynn as Gerald Beresford Wicks
Joan Blondell as Mona Carter
Hugh Herbert as Killigrew Shaw
Edward Everett Horton as Mr. Gratten
Dick Foran as Jink Carter
Beverly Roberts as Alicia
May Robson as Mrs. Leona Wicks
Allen Jenkins as Pinky
Dennie Moore as Clarabelle
Hugh O'Connell as Hotel clerk
James Burke as Snodgrass
Granville Bates as Hooker

Original novel

The book was based on a novel. The New York Times called it "a trifling little number. It reads like one of those old fashioned farce comedies... hammock reading for a hot afternoon."

Production
The film was Flynn's first comedy starring role and the movie always seems to have been considered a vehicle for him. He made it after holidaying in Europe.

Warners originally sought Carole Lombard or Miriam Hopkins to play against Errol Flynn and for a while it seemed Hopkins was set to co-star. However she turned down the role and Warners decided to look at players assigned to their contract roster. The two leading contenders were Olivia de Havilland and Joan Blondell; it was thought the former was ideal if the role was played in a "romantic" way but the latter should be preferred it they wanted someone "pepful and sparkling". Blondell was cast and filming started in May 1937.

Marie Wilson was meant to play a small role but was assigned to The Great Garrick instead. Dennie Moore replaced Jane Wyman.

Joan Blondell fell ill during filming but recovered.

Reception
The New York Times called the film a "light and unaffecting romantic comedy."

May Robson's performance was highly praised in particular.

Box Office
According to Warner Bros records the film earned $786,000 domestically and $495,000 foreign.

References

External links

The Perfect Specimen on Lux Radio Theater: January 2, 1939.
 

1937 films
Films directed by Michael Curtiz
1937 comedy films
Warner Bros. films
American black-and-white films
Films scored by Heinz Roemheld
American comedy films
1930s English-language films
1930s American films